Accademia Fiorentina or Florentine Academy may refer to:

 The Platonic Academy (Florence), founded in 1460 by Marsilio Ficino
 The Accademia Fiorentina, founded in Florence in 1540
 The Accademia Fiorentina delle Arti del Disegno, separated from the Accademia di Belle Arti di Firenze by Grand Duke Pietro Leopoldo in 1784
 The Accademia di Belle Arti di Firenze, an instructional art academy in Florence, in Tuscany, in central Italy

See also
Academy of Florence (disambiguation)